Yaroslava Vladimirovna Frolova (born 18 May 1997) is a Russian handballer for Rostov-Don and the Russian national team.

Achievements
Russian Super League:
Winner: 2014
IHF Junior World Championship:
Silver Medalist: 2016

Individual awards  
 Most valuable player of the IHF Junior World Championship: 2016
 All-Star Centre Back of the EHF Junior European Championship: 2015

References

External links

1997 births
Living people
Sportspeople from Volgograd
Russian female handball players
Handball players at the 2014 Summer Youth Olympics